Patrimonio histórico español is a term for Spain's heritage, including National Heritage Sites. The Ministry of Culture has a department, the Subdirección General de Protección del Patrimonio Histórico ("Bureau of Protection of Historical Heritage") which maintains a heritage register.

The term has a similar meaning to Bien de Interés Cultural (BIC), a designation which includes non-moveable heritage objects such as monuments or historic gardens, as well as moveable heritage objects such as archeological objects, archives and large works of art. The Spanish system is semi-federal and regions have their own registers.

The León Cathedral became the first monument protected as a National Monument in 1844.

Heritage list holders

See also
 Culture of Spain
 Cultural Heritage
 Patrimonio Nacional

References

Notes

 
Spanish culture
Law of Spain